Karol Castillo (29 August 1989 – 10 April 2013) was a Peruvian model and beauty pageant titleholder. She was crowned Miss Perú Universo 2008 and competed in the Miss Universe 2008 pageant, hosted in Nha Trang, Vietnam.

Death
On 10 April 2014, Castillo was found dead in her bed while on a trip to Australia, having suffered from a cardiac arrest. Castillo had travelled to Australia with pageant coach Diego Alcade Sangalli to help with the Miss Teen Australia pageant.

References

External links

1989 births
2013 deaths
Peruvian beauty pageant winners
People from Trujillo, Peru
Miss Universe 2008 contestants
Peruvian child models